GeoJunxion, formerly AND International Publishers NV (AND), supplies digital map data, specific data layers such Low Emission Zones and services around map making.  The products and services are used for GPS-based applications, logistic solutions and map makers.  GeoJunxion NV is quoted on Euronext Amsterdam.

History
AND was founded in 1984 by Hans Abbink and Eiko Dekkers. Surnames of the founders were used to create the company name: AND.  The A, Hans Abbink, stepped down as member of the board of directors of AND in September 2000. Throughout the years the company had many subsidiary names such as AND International Publishers NV, AND Data Solutions, AND Publishes, AND Automotive Navigation Data and AND International Publishers. AND rebranded as GeoJunxion in 2020.

The end of the nineties AND International Publishers aimed to establish itself firmly at the forefront in providing content as well as skills for electronic publishing and advanced technology. AND concentrated its activities in the Netherlands, United Kingdom, Germany and the United States of America. AND production facilities were located in Ireland and India. The company specialized in four key areas:
development and maintenance of databases that model aspects of the world
development of its industry-leading compression and indexing technology to utilize these data models
electronic publications based on these data sets and technology
identification and classification

See also
Geographic Data Files
 GIS

References

External links
 

Geographic data and information companies